The M60 motorway is 56 km long. It begins at the Bóly interchange on the M6 and ends at Pécs. A future extension to the Croatian border at Barcs is planned. When finished, it will connect Pécs with Zagreb.

Municipalities
The M60 motorway runs through the following municipalities:
 Baranya County: Babarc, Szajk, Versend, Monyoród, Szederkény, Belvárdgyula, Birján, Lothárd, Szemely, Kozármisleny, Pécsudvard, Pécs

Openings timeline
Bóly; M6 – Pécs (30 km): 2010.03.31.
Pécs – Pécs-Kökény út (1.8 km): 2015.07.31. - half profile

Junctions, exits and rest area

 The route is full length motorway. The maximum speed limit is 130km/h.

See also 

 Roads in Hungary
 Transport in Hungary

External links 

National Toll Payment Services Plc. (in Hungarian, some information also in English)
National Infrastructure Developer Ltd. (in Hungarian)
Exit list of M60 in motorways-exits.com

60